The 1937 French Championships (now known as the French Open) was a tennis tournament that took place on the outdoor clay courts at the Stade Roland-Garros in Paris, France. The tournament ran from 18 May until 30 May. It was the 42nd staging of the French Championships and the second Grand Slam tournament of the year.

Finals

Men's singles

 Henner Henkel defeated  Bunny Austin 6–1, 6–4, 6–3

Women's singles

 Hilde Sperling defeated  Simonne Mathieu 6–2, 6–4

Men's doubles
 Gottfried von Cramm /  Henner Henkel defeated  Vernon Kirby /  Norman Farquharson  6–4, 7–5, 3–6, 6–1

Women's doubles
 Simonne Mathieu  /  Billie Yorke defeated  Dorothy Andrus /  Sylvie Jung Henrotin 3–6, 6–2, 6–2

Mixed doubles
 Simonne Mathieu /  Yvon Petra  defeated  Marie-Luise Horn /  Roland Journu  7–5, 7–5

References

External links
 French Open official website

French Championships
French Championships
French Championships (tennis) by year
French Championships
French Championships